is a Japanese football player who plays for Omiya Ardija.

Club career statistics
Updated to 19 February 2019.

References

External links
Profile at Júbilo Iwata

1990 births
Living people
Chukyo University alumni
Association football people from Aichi Prefecture
Japanese footballers
J1 League players
J2 League players
Mito HollyHock players
Ventforet Kofu players
Júbilo Iwata players
Gamba Osaka players
V-Varen Nagasaki players
Association football defenders